Megadontomys is a genus of rodent in the family Cricetidae, found in Mexico. 
It contains the following species:
 Oaxaca giant deer mouse (Megadontomys cryophilus)
 Nelson's giant deer mouse (Megadontomys nelsoni)
 Thomas's giant deer mouse (Megadontomys thomasi)

References

 
Rodent genera
Taxa named by Clinton Hart Merriam
Taxonomy articles created by Polbot